Loganholme is a suburb in the City of Logan, Queensland, Australia.

The majority of the land is used for houses while it has range of other uses.

Geography
The suburb is bisected by the Pacific Motorway and the Logan Motorway which aligns with a small section of the northern boundary.  The southern and western boundaries of the suburb follow the Logan River.  Tudor Park on Clarks Road features sports facilities. The Beenleigh–Redland Bay Road exits to the north-east.

A small pocket of land by the Logan River is known as Alexander Clark Park.  The park is well-facilitated and available for large groups and events such as weddings.

East of the motorway is a large commercial and industrial area, adjacent to vacant flood plains.  Here the largest wastewater treatment plant in the City of Logan began an upgrade process in 2014.  The upgrade was needed to meet population growth in the area.

In the northern tip of Loganholme, adjacent to the Logan Hyperdome is a retail district with a public hotel, Officeworks, Foodworks and Harvey Norman stores.  Nearby, along Bryants Road is the Loganholme police station.

History

A cotton gin, which was converted to a sugar mill, was built at Loganholme in 1867.

Loganholme State School opened on 24 May 1873. It closed on 28 Feb 1890, reopening as Loganholme Provisional School in April 1890. On 23 January 1893 it became Loganholme State School once again.

The existing ferry crossing at Loganhholme, known as the Beenleigh Ferry, established in the 1870s, was facing increased delays by the 1920s as vehicle traffic passing through the area increased dramatically.  A road crossing from Loganholme to Beenleigh was opened in July 1931.  The bridge here was duplicated in May 1968 and rebuilt in 1999 when the Pacific Motorway was widened.

Until 1949, Loganholme was within Shire of Tingalpa.

St Matthew's Catholic Primary School opened on 23 January 1984 in the tradition of Mary MacKillop. It is now within the boundaries of the neighbouring suburb of Cornubia.

The median age of the Loganholme population was 31 years, 6 years below the national median of 37.  73.2% of people living in Loganholme were born in Australia. The other top responses for country of birth were New Zealand 8%, England 4.8%, South Africa 1%, Philippines 0.8%, Scotland 0.7%.  90.1% of people spoke only English at home; the next most common languages were 0.5% Vietnamese, 0.5% Mandarin, 0.4% Hindi, 0.4% Samoan, 0.3% German.

Education 
Loganholme State School is a government primary (Prep-6) school for boys and girls at Wandilla Crescent. In 2017, the school had an enrolment of 541 students with 37 teachers (33 full-time equivalent) and 22 non-teaching staff (14 full-time equivalent). It includes a special education program.

Transport 

A bus interchange is located adjacent to the Logan Hyperdome.  A regular bus links to both Beenleigh and Logan Central. The grade separated intersection of the two motorways was originally built in 1988.

Notable People
Kristy Wallace (b. 1996), WNBA player for the Atlanta Dream

References

External links